Luismel Morris Calero (born 14 December 1997) is a Cuban professional footballer who plays as a midfielder.

Career
Morris started his career playing for the Cuba U20 team in a 1-1 draw against Japan U19 at the World Youth Festival Toulon. In 2018 Morris made his senior debut in 3-1 loss to Nicaragua. During the qualifiers of the CONCACAF Nations League, he scored twice against Turks and Caicos Islands resulting a large 11-0 win for Cuba.

On 21 June 2019, after Cuba's second match at the 2019 CONCACAF Gold Cup, Morris along two other teammates defected.

International career

International goals
Scores and results list Cuba's goal tally first.

References

1997 births
Living people
Cuban footballers
Cuba international footballers
Cuba youth international footballers
Association football forwards
FC Camagüey players
2019 CONCACAF Gold Cup players
People from Camagüey Province
21st-century Cuban people